Cyril Lea (born 5 August 1934) is a Welsh former footballer. He was born in Wrexham, and was capped on two occasions by Wales.

He played for Leyton Orient and Ipswich Town, and was responsible for team selection at Portman Road for two months between the departure of Bill McGarry and the arrival of Bobby Robson.

Lea later became manager of Colchester United, and was in charge at Layer Road between February 1983 and April 1986.

Managerial statistics

Honours
Ipswich Town
Football League Second Division: 1967–68

Individual
Ipswich Town Hall of Fame: Inducted 2010

References

Welsh footballers
1934 births
Living people
Leyton Orient F.C. players
Ipswich Town F.C. players
Ipswich Town F.C. managers
Colchester United F.C. managers
Association football wing halves
Stoke City F.C. non-playing staff
Welsh football managers
Wales international footballers